Ebrington (known locally as Yabberton or Yubberton) is a village and civil parish in Gloucestershire, England, about  from Chipping Campden. It has narrow lanes and tiny streets of Cotswold stone houses and cottages, many of which are thatched.

History
Ebrington is mentioned in the Domesday Book of 1086 as a settlement of 33 households situated within hundred of Witley and the county of Gloucestershire.

Ebrington Manor has existed at Ebrington since the 14th century; it is owned by the Fortescue family who also had estates in Exmoor.

The ancient church of St Eadburga shows many monuments to the family including one to Sir John Fortescue in his robes as Lord Chief Justice. Sir John died in 1476. The church is mainly Perpendicular with some Norman work remaining in the north and south doorways, of its other notable features the church shows a 17th-century canopied pulpit and medieval stained glass windows. It is a Grade I listed building.

Near Ebrington is the National Trust property of Hidcote Manor with notable Cotswold gardens.

The Ebrington Arms pub at the centre of the village dates from 1640, and was voted the Campaign for Real Ale (CAMRA) North Cotswolds Pub of the Year in 2009, 2010 and 2011. It has held two AA Rosettes for food since 2010.

Ebrington Primary school is federated with a larger primary (St James in Chipping Campden). It received a "Good" Ofsted inspection in 2014 and in 2019 was rated as "Requires Improvement". Ebrington Primary celebrated its 175 birthday in 2016 with a 'living history' day for the children and the official opening of new playground equipment.

Geography
The Fruit and Vegetable Preservation Research Station was built in the west of the village.

References

External links

 St. Eadburgha's Church, Ebrington
 The Ebrington Arms

Villages in Gloucestershire
Cotswold District